S K Sahni  is a retired  lieutenant general in the Indian Army. He retired in 2006. On February 19, 2011, he was sentenced to jail by a general court martial in Jalandhar on six charges of "intent to defraud" relating to food past its expiry date which was supplied to Indian Army troops in Jammu and Kashmir. This was the first instance when a retired Indian Army lieutenant general was jailed by a court martial.

References

Indian generals
Living people
Year of birth missing (living people)